Elliottia pyroliflora, the copperbush, is a plant in the family Ericaceae native to North America. It is a perennial shrub. Its leaves are alternate in arrangement with flat margins.

Distribution and habitat
The plant is found in the Northwestern United States in Oregon, Washington, Alaska, and in Western Canada in British Columbia. Its habitats include mountainous regions, stream banks, and forest edges.

References

External links
USDA Plants Profile
Washington Burke Museum

Ericoideae
Flora of Alaska
Flora of British Columbia
Flora of Oregon
Flora of Washington (state)
Flora without expected TNC conservation status